Sébastien Lapaque (born 2 February 1971) is a French writer.

Awards
2000 : Prix François Mauriac de l'Académie française
2002 : Prix Goncourt de la Nouvelle, Mythologie Française
2004 : Prix James-Hennessy

Works

Novels
Les Barricades mystérieuses (with a préface de Frédéric H. Fajardie), co-édition : éditions Actes Sud, coll. « Babel noir » no 319, Arles, 1998, et éditions Leméac, Montréal, 1998, 268 p., (Actes Sud) ou (Leméac), (Notice BNF no FRBNF36703273w)
Les Idées heureuses, éditions Actes Sud, coll. « Domaine français », Arles, 1999, 163 p.,, (Notice BNF no FRBNF37053414w)
Les Identités remarquables, éditions Actes Sud, coll. « Domaine français », Arles, 2009, 174 p.,, (Notice BNF no FRBNF420258388)

Essays and pamphlets 
Georges Bernanos encore une fois:
première édition – Co-édition : éditions L'Âge d'Homme, Lausanne, et éditions Les Provinciales, Lyon, 1998, 126 p.,, (Notice BNF no FRBNF361984217)
réédition – Éditions Actes Sud, coll. « Babel » no 534, Arles, 2002, 167 p.,, (Notice BNF no FRBNF38823047n)
Sous le soleil de l’exil, Georges Bernanos au Brésil, 1938–1945, éditions Bernard Grasset, Paris, 2002, 226 p.,, (Notice BNF no FRBNF389499266)
Il faut qu'il parte, éditions Stock, Paris, 2008, 134 p.,, (Notice BNF no FRBNF41271136x)
Sermon de saint François d'Assise aux oiseaux et aux fusées, éditions Stock, Paris, 2008, 90 p.,, (Notice BNF no FRBNF413726101)

Short stories
2001 : Le spleen de Ben Hur in Lectures pour tous, contre le prêt payant en bibliothèque publique, Cétacé, collection dirigée par Didier Daeninckx et Valère Staraselski, Éditions Bérénice.
2002 : Mythologie française, Actes Sud.
2004 : Le Mot de la fin in Le Dernier Homme, nouvelles présentées et rassemblées par Jérôme Leroy, Le Belles Lettres
2010 : Le Dernier roi de Belomanie, la Nouvelle Revue Française n°595, Gallimard.

Anthologies 
1999 : Triomphe de Dionysos, avec Jérôme Leroy, Actes Sud.
2002 : J’ai vu passer dans mon rêve, anthologie de la poésie française, Librio
2004 : Le goût de Rio de Janeiro, Mercure de France
2004 : Le goût d'Athènes, Mercure de France
2009 : Les 7 péchés capitaux, Librio

References

1971 births
Living people
People from Tübingen
21st-century French novelists
21st-century French essayists
21st-century French journalists
French male essayists
French male novelists
Prix Goncourt de la nouvelle recipients
21st-century French male writers